William Carpenter may refer to:

William Carpenter (1797–1874), theological and political writer, journalist, and editor
William Carpenter (Australian politician) (1863–1930), Australian politician
William Carpenter (flat-Earth theorist) (1830–1896), advocate of the Flat Earth theory
William Carpenter (painter) (1818–1899), watercolours of India
William Carpenter (Rhode Island colonist) (c. 1610–1685), co-founder of Rhode Island and Providence Plantations
William Carpenter (writer) (born 1940), American author
William Benjamin Carpenter (1813–1885), English physiologist and naturalist
William Boyd Carpenter (1841–1918), Church of England clergyman and bishop of Ripon
William H. Carpenter (1821–1885), U.S. Consul to Fuzhou, China, during the American Civil War years
William Henry Carpenter (philologist) (1853–1936), American philologist
William Hookham Carpenter (1792–1866), keeper at the British Museum
William J. Carpenter (1827–1921), West Virginia outdoorsman
Ken Carpenter (discus thrower) (William Kenneth Carpenter), Olympic discus winner
William Kyle Carpenter, (born 1989), Medal of Honor recipient
William L. Carpenter (1844–1898), U.S. Army officer, naturalist and geologist
William L. Carpenter (Michigan judge) (1854–1936), member of the Michigan Supreme Court 
William Marbury Carpenter (1811–1848), American physician and naturalist
William Randolph Carpenter (1894–1956), US congressman
Bill Carpenter (William S. Carpenter, Jr., born 1937), American football player and army officer
William T. Carpenter, psychiatrist
William Thomas Carpenter (1854–1933), cowman and author
William Carpenter of Rehoboth (born 1605), co-founder of Rehoboth, Massachusetts, see Rehoboth Carpenter family
William the Carpenter (fl. 1087–1102), French nobleman

See also
Bill Carpenter (rugby league) (fl. 1920s–1930s), Australian rugby league player
Willie C. Carpenter (fl. 1970s–2020s), American actor
List of people with surname Carpenter#W